John McGarry, OC (born 1957) is a political scientist from Northern Ireland. He was born in Belfast and grew up in Ballymena, County Antrim. He is currently Professor of Political Studies and Canada Research Chair in Nationalism and Democracy at Queen's University in Kingston, Ontario, Canada. He is the author of numerous influential books about ethnic conflict and particularly The Troubles. Many of the books were co-authored with Brendan O'Leary, whom McGarry met when they both attended Saint MacNissi's College. McGarry and O'Leary's Policing Northern Ireland: Proposals for a New Start (Blackstaff Press, 1999) had a significant influence on the work of the Independent Commission on Policing for Northern Ireland. He currently sits on the advisory council of the Centre for the Study of Democracy and worked as a senior advisor on power-sharing to the United Nations in 2008–09. 

In addition to teaching, he is currently the senior advisor on governance to the UN-led negotiations in Cyprus. His contribution and work were recognised in 2010, when he was invested into the Royal Society of Canada. He won Canada's prestigious Trudeau Fellowship Prize in 2011. In 2013, he was awarded the Queen Elizabeth II Diamond Jubilee Medal, and the Killam Prize. The latter is Canada's most prestigious research prize.

In 2014, McGarry won the Innis-Gérin Medal from the Royal Society of Canada, its top award in the social sciences. In 2015, his research on conflict resolution was recognised by the Council of Ontario Universities (COU) as one of the top 50 examples of "game-changing" research conducted in Ontario during the past 100 years.  

McGarry and O'Leary have long backed consociationalism (power-sharing) as a method of conflict management and are widely considered to be the two leading theorists working in this field. Arend Lijphart has been a significant influence on their work. In 2009, a book entitled Consociational Theory: McGarry and O'Leary and the Northern Ireland Conflict was published, edited by Rupert Taylor.

On 30 June 2016, McGarry was made an Officer of the Order of Canada by Governor General David Johnston for "his scholarly contributions to the study of ethnic conflict and for designing Governance Frameworks that promote peace."

References

External links
John McGarry's homepage

Living people
1957 births
Canada Research Chairs
Scholars of nationalism
Academic staff of the Queen's University at Kingston
Canadian political scientists
Officers of the Order of Canada
Northern Ireland emigrants to Canada
Writers from Belfast